Air Commodore Andrew George Board  (11 May 1878 – 25 February 1973) was an English soldier and airman. He was a pioneer aviator, first gaining a licence in 1910, who later became an air commodore in the Royal Air Force.

South Wales Borderers
Following a time in the militia, Board was commissioned as a second lieutenant in the South Wales Borderers. In 1910, at his own expense, he learned to fly at Hendon. On 29 November 1910, flying a Bleriot monoplane there, he was awarded the Royal Aero Club Aviator's Certificate No. 36.

In the 1911 Census he was listed as a captain of the 2nd Battalion South Wales Borderers at the Artillery Barracks Pretoria, South Africa.

Royal Flying Corps
By 1914, Board had become a flying instructor at the Central Flying School at Netheravon, Wiltshire. On 28 September 1914 he became the officer commanding 7 Squadron RFC at Netheravon before moving to the western front in April 1915 to command 5 Squadron RFC. He later commanded the 10th Wing RFC before taking over 20th (Reserve) Wing in Egypt.

With the formation of the Royal Air Force in 1918, Broad was awarded a permanent commission as a lieutenant colonel. He rose to the rank of air commodore before retiring in 1931. In 1939 he re-joined the RAF as a group captain before retiring again in 1941. In 1943 he became a Deputy Lieutenant in Caernarvon.

Honours and award
 1 January 1918 Distinguished Service Order to Maj (T /Lt -Col.) Andrew George Board, S W Borderers and RFC for distinguished service in the Field.
 1 January 1919 Companion of the Order of St Michael and St George to Lt.-Col. (A./Col.) Andrew George Board, DSO, in recognition of distinguished services rendered during the War.

Family
Board was born in Westerham, Kent, on 11 May 1878, the third son of Major John Board and his wife Mary; his father was a magistrate. He married Mrs Phyllis Agnew at St James's Piccadilly on 18 August 1932.

References

1878 births
1973 deaths
English aviators
Aviation pioneers
Royal Flying Corps officers
Royal Air Force officers
South Wales Borderers officers
Deputy Lieutenants of Caernarvonshire
Companions of the Order of St Michael and St George
Companions of the Distinguished Service Order
British Army personnel of World War I
Royal Air Force personnel of World War I
Royal Air Force personnel of World War II